Jason Anthony Parker (born January 23, 1985) is a former American football defensive end for the Sacramento Mountain Lions of the United Football League. He was signed by the Kansas City Chiefs as an undrafted free agent in 2008. He played college football at Arizona.

Early years
Parker prepped at Mission Bay Senior High School in San Diego, California where he played defensive end and tight end.

College career
Parker played college football at the University of Arizona.

Professional career

Kansas City Chiefs
After going undrafted in the 2008 NFL Draft, Parker signed with the Kansas City Chiefs as an undrafted free agent. He was waived during final cuts on August 30, only to be re-signed to the team's practice squad on September 2. He was released on October 1.

California Redwoods
Parker was signed by the California Redwoods of the United Football League on August 18, 2009.

References

External links
 Just Sports Stats
 Arizona Wildcats bio

1985 births
Living people
Players of American football from San Diego
American football defensive ends
Arizona Wildcats football players
Kansas City Chiefs players
Sacramento Mountain Lions players